West Renfrewshire was a constituency of the Scottish Parliament (Holyrood). It elected one Member of the Scottish Parliament (MSP) by the first past the post method of election. Also, however, it was one of nine constituencies in the West of Scotland electoral region, which elected seven additional members, in addition to nine constituency MSPs, to produce a form of proportional representation for the region as a whole.

For the 2011 Scottish Parliament election, West Renfrewshire was abolished. Two new seats were created: Renfrewshire North and West, and Renfrewshire South.

Electoral region 

The other eight constituencies of the West of Scotland region are: Dumbarton, Clydebank and Milngavie, Cunninghame North, Eastwood, Paisley North, Greenock and Inverclyde, Paisley South and Strathkelvin and Bearsden.

The region covers the West Dunbartonshire council area, the East Renfrewshire council area, the Inverclyde council area, most of the Renfrewshire council area, most of the East Dunbartonshire council area, part of the Argyll and Bute council area and part of the North Ayrshire council area.

Constituency boundaries 

The West Renfrewshire constituency was created at the same time as the Scottish Parliament, in 1999, with the name and boundaries of an  existing Westminster constituency. In 2005, however, the Westminster (House of Commons) constituency was divided between new constituencies.

Council areas 

The Holyrood constituency covered a western portion of the Renfrewshire council area and an eastern portion of the Inverclyde council area. The rest of the Renfrewshire area was covered by the Paisley North, Paisley South and Glasgow Govan constituencies; Glasgow Govan was in the Glasgow electoral region. The Greenock and Inverclyde constituency covered the rest of the Inverclyde area. The boundaries of these other constituencies were also redrawn in 2011.

Member of the Scottish Parliament

Election results

2000s

1990s

Notes and references 

Scottish Parliament constituencies and regions 1999–2011
Politics of Renfrewshire
1999 establishments in Scotland
Constituencies established in 1999
2011 disestablishments in Scotland
Constituencies disestablished in 2011
Port Glasgow
Politics of Inverclyde